In geometry, the order-3 apeirogonal tiling is a regular tiling of the hyperbolic plane. It is represented by the Schläfli symbol {∞,3}, having three regular apeirogons around each vertex.  Each apeirogon is inscribed in a horocycle.

The order-2 apeirogonal tiling represents an infinite dihedron in the Euclidean plane as {∞,2}.

Images
Each apeirogon face is circumscribed by a horocycle, which looks like a circle in a Poincaré disk model, internally tangent to the projective circle boundary.

Uniform colorings 
Like the Euclidean hexagonal tiling, there are 3 uniform colorings of the order-3 apeirogonal tiling, each from different reflective triangle group domains:

Symmetry
The dual to this tiling represents the fundamental domains of [(∞,∞,∞)] (*∞∞∞) symmetry. There are 15 small index subgroups (7 unique) constructed from [(∞,∞,∞)] by mirror removal and alternation. Mirrors can be removed if its branch orders are all even, and cuts neighboring branch orders in half. Removing two mirrors leaves a half-order gyration point where the removed mirrors met. In these images fundamental domains are alternately colored black and white, and mirrors exist on the boundaries between colors. The symmetry can be doubled as ∞∞2 symmetry by adding a mirror bisecting the fundamental domain. Dividing a fundamental domain by 3 mirrors creates a ∞32 symmetry.

A larger subgroup is constructed [(∞,∞,∞*)], index 8, as (∞*∞∞) with gyration points removed, becomes (*∞∞).

Related polyhedra and tilings 

This tiling is topologically related as a part of sequence of regular polyhedra with Schläfli symbol {n,3}.

See also

Tilings of regular polygons
List of uniform planar tilings
List of regular polytopes
Hexagonal tiling honeycomb, similar {6,3,3} honeycomb in H3.

References

 John H. Conway, Heidi Burgiel, Chaim Goodman-Strass, The Symmetries of Things 2008,  (Chapter 19, The Hyperbolic Archimedean Tessellations)

External links 

Apeirogonal tilings
Hyperbolic tilings
Isogonal tilings
Isohedral tilings
Order-3 tilings
Regular tilings